= Arkendale, Virginia =

Unincorporated community in Virginia, US

Coordinates: 38°26′18″N 77°20′33″W

Arkendale is an unincorporated community in Stafford County, in the U.S. state of Virginia.
